"The Less I Know the Better" is a song released by the Australian rock band Tame Impala on 29 November 2015 as the fourth and final single from their third studio album, Currents. The song's accompanying music video mixes hand-drawn animation with live action and takes place in a high school, especially the gym and locker room, where a male basketball player suffers a broken heart.

In 2016, the song peaked at number 23 on the Belgian Flanders singles chart, number 66 on the ARIA Singles Chart, and number 195 on the French Singles Chart. In the US, the song charted at number 35 on Billboard Hot Rock Songs chart.

The song, along with "Let It Happen", was one of two from Currents to reach the top five in Triple J's Hottest 100 of 2015, ranking at number 4, whilst "Let It Happen" ranked at number 5.

It also topped Triple J's Hottest 100 of the 2010s in March 2020. The week after reaching #1 in Triple J's Hottest 100 of the 2010s, the song entered the ARIA Top 50 for the first time, charting 49 places higher than its previous peak of #66.

In May 2021, APRA AMCOS confirmed the song surpassed one billion streams.

Background
Parker stated that "The Less I Know the Better" originated from his love of disco:

According to Parker, recording the song became obsessive. He recalled performing over 1,057 partial vocal takes for either "The Less I Know the Better" or the album's second single, "'Cause I'm a Man", though he could not recall which.

Music video
The official music video for the song was uploaded on 29 November 2015 to the group's Vevo channel. It is sexually explicit. The video follows a male high school basketball player lusting after a cheerleader, who soon begins a relationship with the team's gorilla mascot (named "Trevor", a reference to the lyric "She was holding hands with Trevor" in the song). The music video was filmed by the Barcelona-based creative collective and directors known as Canada. The two primary lovebirds in the video are played by Spanish actors: the cheerleader is portrayed by actress Laia Manzanares; the basketball player by actor Albert Baró.

Lars Brandle of Billboard described it as "a strange tale of high school lust and jealousy (and King Kong) played out in a technicolor trip", while Luke Saunders of Happy Mag called it a "seriously incredible experience".

Charts

Weekly charts

Year-end charts

Certifications

References

External links
 

2015 singles
2015 songs
Tame Impala songs
Disco songs
Funk songs
Modular Recordings singles
Song recordings produced by Kevin Parker (musician)
Songs written by Kevin Parker (musician)